Daada is a 1988 Indian Kannada-language film,  directed by P. Vasu and produced by R. K. Manik Chand. The film stars Vishnuvardhan, Geetha, Suparna and Sangeetha. The musical score was composed by Vijay Anand.

Cast

Vishnuvardhan as Ganga alias Daada and Gururaj 
Geetha
Suparna Anand as Press Officer Sudha
Sangeetha as Seetha
K. S. Ashwath as Senior Daada
Pandari Bai as Daada's mother
Ramesh Bhat as Krishna 
Devaraj as Micheal
Avinash 
Sudarshan 
Mysore Lokesh
Balakrishna
Sundar Krishna Urs
Doddanna
Lohithashwa
Shanimahadevappa
Lakshman

Soundtrack
The music was composed by Vijay Anand.

References

External links

1988 films
1980s Kannada-language films
Films directed by P. Vasu